NICO Touches the Walls no Best is the first best of album by the Japanese rock band NICO Touches the Walls, released on February 5, 2014, on NICO day, in celebration of their 10th anniversary. The album includes the single "Niwaka Ame ni Mo Makezu", used as the Naruto Shippuden opening theme; the new songs "Rawhide" and "Pandora", used in the movie Genome Hazard as well as a new recording version of the song "image training". The album is available in both regular and limited editions. The limited edition DVD includes a studio live video titled "Walls Is (re)Beginning", with all their songs from the first mini album Walls Is Beginning performed live.

Track listing

Limited edition

References 

Nico Touches the Walls albums
Japanese-language compilation albums
Sony Music compilation albums
2014 compilation albums